The Glasgow Gaiety Theatre was a cine-theatre in Anderston Cross, Glasgow, Scotland. Originally known as the Victoria Music Hall, then the Tivoli Variety Theatre, and co-founded by a grandson of James Baylis of the Theatre Royal, Glasgow it opened in 1899 presenting Musicals, variety shows and pantomimes. When it was rebuilt in 1904 it changed to operate as a cine-variety under the name of Gaiety Theatre, becoming a full cinema in 1935. The Beatles appeared there in 1963. The cinema closed in 1965. It is not to be confused with the Gaiety Theatre, Sauchiehall Street, which became the Empire Theatre.

References

Further reading
The Theatre Royal: Entertaining a Nation by Graeme Smith published 2008 

Former theatres in Scotland
Theatres in Glasgow
1899 establishments in Scotland
Theatres completed in 1899